Ungar is a surname. Notable people with the surname include:

 Benjamin (Benji) Ungar (1986–), an American Épée fencer
 David Ungar, an American engineer
 Hermann Ungar (1893–1929), a Bohemian writer of German language and an officer in the Ministry of Foreign Affairs of Czechoslovakia
 Jay Ungar (1946–), an American fiddler and composer
 Ruth Ungar (1976–) usually known as Ruthy, American multi-instrumentalist and singer. Member of The Mammals and daughter of Jay Ungar
 Sanford J. Ungar (1945–), an American journalist and former president of Goucher College
 Shmuel Dovid Ungar (1886–1945), Rav of Nitra, Slovakia
 Shmueli Ungar, American singer
 Simon Ungar (1864–1942), rabbi of the Osijek Jewish Community 
 Stu Ungar (1953–1998), a professional poker and gin rummy player
 William Ungar (1913–2013), founder of the National Envelope Corporation

See also
Frederick Ungar Publishing Company, a New York publishing firm founded in 1940
Ungar (grape), another name for the Hungarian wine grape Green Hungarian
Unger

German-language surnames
Jewish surnames
Surnames of Hungarian origin
Ethnonymic surnames